Sheldon L. Gaines (born April 22, 1964) is a former professional American football wide receiver who played for the Buffalo Bills in 1987. He also played in the CFL for the Winnipeg Blue Bombers.

External links
Pro-Football-Reference

1964 births
Living people
Players of American football from Los Angeles
American football wide receivers
Buffalo Bills players
Long Beach State 49ers football players
Moorpark Raiders football players
National Football League replacement players